Cedaromys ("Cedar mouse") is an extinct mammal which lived during the Upper Cretaceous, at the same time as many dinosaurs. It was a member of the also extinct order of Multituberculata. It's within the suborder of Cimolodonta, and a possible member of the Paracimexomys group.

Species
The species Cedaromys bestia was originally named Paracimexomys bestia in 1991, but later reassigned to Cedaromys by Eaton and Cifelli in 2001. Fossils have been found in Albian (late) - Cenomanian (early), (both Upper Cretaceous)-aged strata of the Cedar Mountain Formation in Utah (United States).

Fossils of the species Cedaromys parvus (Eaton & Cifelli, 2001) have been found in strata of the same age in the Cedar Mountain Formation. This species is also in the Oklahoma collection. Suggested bodyweight is around 90 g.

References 

 Eaton & Cifelli (2001), "Multituberculate mammals from near the Early-Late Cretaceous boundary, Cedar Mountain Formation, Utah". Acta Palaeontologica Polonica 46(4), p. 453-518.
 Kielan-Jaworowska Z & Hurum JH (2001), "Phylogeny and Systematics of multituberculate mammals". Paleontology 44, p. 389-429.
 Eaton, J.G. (2009). Cenomanian (Late Cretaceous) mammals from Cedar Canyon, southwestern Utah, and a revision of Cenomanian Alphadon-like marsupials; pp. 97–110 in Albright, L.B.I. (ed.), Papers on Geology, Vertebrate Paleontology, and Biostratigraphy in Honor of Michael O. Woodburne. Museum of Northern Arizona Bulletin 65.

Late Cretaceous mammals of North America
Cimolodonts
Extinct mammals of North America
Prehistoric mammal genera